Vinod Khanna (6 October 1946 – 27 April 2017) was an Indian actor, film producer and politician who is best known for his work in Hindi films; while also being a notable spiritual seeker. In Bollywood, he was the recipient of two Filmfare awards. Khanna was one of the highest-paid stars of his times, along with Amitabh Bachchan and Rajesh Khanna. He gave competition to Amitabh Bachchan's box office run in late 1970s to early 1980s before taking break from films. After joining politics, he became the MP from the Gurdaspur constituency between 1998–2009 and 2014–2017. In July 2002, Khanna became the minister for Culture and Tourism in the Atal Bihari Vajpayee cabinet. Six months later, he became the Minister of State for External Affairs.

Khanna made his film debut in 1968, and initially acted in supporting and antagonistic roles; as an angry young man in the movie Mere Apne, as the main villain in the highly successful crime drama  Mera Gaon Mera Desh, and as the military officer turned fugitive in the critically acclaimed movie Achanak, which was a film based on the events of K. M. Nanavati v. State of Maharashtra. Khanna played lead roles in many films and is best remembered for his performances in Kuchhe Dhaage, Gaddaar, Imtihaan, Muqaddar Ka Sikandar, Inkaar, Amar Akbar Anthony, Rajput, The Burning Train, Qurbani, Kudrat, Parvarish, Khoon Pasina, Dayavan, Chandni and Jurm.

In 1982, at the peak of his film career, Khanna temporarily took a break from the film industry to follow his spiritual guru Osho Rajneesh. After a 5-year hiatus, he returned to the Hindi film industry with two hit films – Insaaf and Satyamev Jayate. In his later film career, Khanna played several memorable roles as a father in blockbuster movies such as Wanted (2009), Dabangg (2010) and Dabangg 2 (2012).

Khanna has been posthumously awarded India's highest award in cinema, the Dadasaheb Phalke Award in 2018 by the Government of India at 65th National Film Awards.

Early life
Khanna was born in a Hindkowan Hindu family to Kamla and Krishanchand Khanna on 6 October 1946, in Peshawar, British India (now in Pakistan). He had three sisters and one brother. Shortly after his birth, India was partitioned and the family left Peshawar and moved to Bombay (present-day Mumbai).

He attended St. Mary's School, Bombay until class II and then transferred to Delhi. In 1957, the family moved to Delhi where he attended Delhi Public School, Mathura Road. Although the family moved back to Bombay in 1960, he was sent to Barnes School in Deolali, near Nashik. During his time at the boarding school Khanna watched the epics Solva Saal and Mughal-e-Azam and fell in love with motion pictures. He graduated with a commerce degree from Sydenham College, Bombay. Khanna loved cricket and had said that "there was a time when I played fair cricket with (Test player) Budhi Kunderan.. but settled for films the moment I realised I couldn't be a Vishwanath! Even so cricket, not films, is my first love," as per his interview with The Illustrated Weekly of India in 1979.

Career

Early film Career (1968–1971) 
Vinod was spotted by Sunil Dutt after graduation, and made his acting debut in Sunil Dutt's 1968 film Man Ka Meet (directed by Adurthi Subba Rao) as a villain and in which Som Dutt was the hero, a remake of the Tamil film Kumari Penn. At the start of his career, he played supporting or villainous characters in films such as Purab Aur Paschim, Sachaa Jhutha, Aan Milo Sajna and Mastana in 1970, and in Mera Gaon Mera Desh, Mere Apne and Elaan in 1971.

Prime Film Career (1971–1982) 
From playing villain Khanna successfully switched over to playing the popular hero. He got his first break as the solo lead in Hum Tum Aur Woh (1971) opposite Bharathi Vishnuvardhan and followed it up with Gulzar's Mere Apne. In 1973 his performance as an army officer facing death row in Gulzar's Achanak, earned him critical acclaim. In 1974 he played a college professor in Imtihan, which proved successful even in the face of stiff competition from Roti Kapda Aur Makan and Majboor. Amar Akbar Anthony and Muqaddar Ka Sikandar in which he costarred Amitabh Bacchan went on to become the highest grossing Indian movies of 1977 and 1978 respectively. Muqaddar Ka Sikandar was the third highest-grossing Hindi movie in the 1970s after Sholay and Bobby. At the peak of his popularity he played a supporting role in the 1978 Main Tulsi Tere Aangan Ki a heroine-dominated movie with stalwarts Asha Parekh and Nutan.

Some of the successful movies of this era include Hatyara with Moushumi Chatterjee, Qaid with Leena Chandavarkar, Inkaar with Vidya Sinha, Aap Ki Khatir with Rekha, Khoon Ki Pukaar, Shaque and Adha Din Aadhi Raat with Shabana Azmi, and Daulat with Zeenat Aman. In 1980, he starred in Feroz Khan's Qurbani (1980) which became the highest-grossing film of that year. He was, at the time, one of the highest paid actors in Hindi films.

Vinod also starred in 47 multi-hero films. In Shankar Shambhu he co-starred with Feroz Khan and in Chor Sipahee and Ek Aur Ek Gyarah he co-starred with Shashi Kapoor, in Hera Pheri, Khoon Pasina, Amar Akbar Anthony, Zameer, Parvarish and Muqaddar Ka Sikandar Khanna appeared with Amitabh Bachchan; and in Haath Ki Safai and Aakhri Daku he co-starred with Randhir Kapoor. He appeared with Sunil Dutt in Daku Aur Jawan and in Nehle pe Dehla. He acted with Jeetendra in Ek Hasina Do Diwane, Ek Bechara, Parichay, Insaan, Anokhi Ada and Janam Kundli. He did Rakhwala, Mera Gaon Mera Desh, Patthar Aur Payal, The Burning Train, Batwara and Farishtay with Dharmendra. He worked with Shatrughan Sinha in films such as Panch Dushman, Bombay 405 Miles, Dost Aur Dushman, Pyaar Ka Rishta, Daulat Ke Dushman and Do Yaar, beginning with Gulzar's directorial debut Mere Apne.

Gulzar worked with him in Achanak, Meera and Lekin, after his first movie Mere Apne.

Break from Films for Spirituality (1982–1986) 
In 1982, Khanna took a break from the film industry to be with his guru Osho Rajneesh at the new Ashram in Oregon, USA. Earlier, Khanna had met his spiritual guru Osho (Rajneesh) sometime in the mid-1970's and had started visiting the Osho Ashram in Pune over the weekends for meditation. Khanna, who had taken initiation into Osho's neo-sanyas with the name Swami Vinod Bharti, also worked as a gardener at the Ashram. Around 1986, the Osho ashram in the US developed friction with the US government and got closed, following which Khanna came back to Mumbai and re-joined the film industry. When questioned whether he had quit following Osho, Khanna would show the wooden bead mala given to him by Osho, which he always wore; and he continued to visit Osho Nisarga Ashram, situated in Dharamshala in the Himalayas until his last years.

Later Film Career (1987–2015) 
After returning to Bollywood in 1987, Khanna starred in Insaaf along with Dimple Kapadia. After Qurbani, he worked again with Feroz Khan in Dayavan (1988), a remake of Maniratnam's Nayakan. In 1989, he co-starred in romantic blockbuster Chandni, but was mostly getting roles in action films. He made a popular pair with Meenakshi Seshadri with movies like Jurm, Mahaadev, Police Aur Mujrim, Humshakal and Satyamev Jayate proving successful. His Muzaffar Ali-directed Dimple Kapadia-starring Zooni remained unreleased.

In the 1990s, Khanna appeared in a string of commercial films including Muqaddar Ka Badshaah, CID, Jurm, Lekin, Humshakal, Aakhri Adaalat, Maha-Sangram, Khoon Ka Karz, Police Aur Mujrim, Kshatriya, Insaaniyat Ke Devta, Ekka Raja Rani and Eena Meena Deeka. Salman Khan played a supporting role in Nishchaiy in which Vinod Khanna played the main lead. Actor Ranjeet directed him in Kaarnama. He co-starred with Raaj Kumar in Suryaa: An Awakening.

In 1997, he launched his son Akshaye Khanna in Himalay Putra in which he also starred alongside him. In 1999, Vinod Khanna received a Filmfare Lifetime Achievement Award for his contribution to the industry for over three decades. Since then, he started playing character roles in films such as Deewaanapan (2002), Red Alert: The War Within. In 2007, he starred in the Pakistani film Godfather. Khanna also played several strong fatherly roles, including Salman Khan's father in blockbuster movies such as Wanted (2009), Dabangg (2010) and Dabangg 2 (2012).

Khanna also ventured into television, playing the male lead role of "Kashinath" in the Smriti Irani-produced Hindi serial mere apne, which aired on the channel 9X in 2009. In 2014, he played the lead role in Koyelaanchal, in which he played the role of a Godfather and leader of the coal mafia. His last film to be released before his death was the 2015 film Dilwale alongside Shah Rukh Khan. The film was directed by Rohit Shetty and released on 18 December 2015 worldwide. He also acted in the film Ek Thi Rani Aisi Bhi, a biopic based on the life and times of Vijaya Raje Scindia of Gwalior. The film was released on Zee TV. In 2020, a delayed film he had shot and completed in 2014 was released titled Guns of Banaras which officially marks his final film appearance.

Politics
In 1997, Khanna joined the Bharatiya Janata Party and was elected from Gurdaspur constituency in Punjab in the next year's Lok Sabha poll. In 1999, he was re-elected to the Lok Sabha from the same constituency. Later, he became union minister for culture and tourism in July 2002. Six months later, he was moved to the Ministry of External Affairs (MEA) as Minister of State. In 2004 he won re-election from Gurdaspur. However, Khanna lost out in the 2009 general elections. In the 2014 general election he was again elected for the 16th Lok Sabha from the same constituency. No other Bollywood star has triumphed in four Lok Sabha polls (1998, 1999, 2004 and 2014). He also served as Union minister of state for tourism and culture, as well as external affairs.

Personal life

Khanna met his first wife Gitanjali Taleyarkhan in college. Khanna married Gitanjali in 1971 and had two sons with her, Rahul and Akshaye; both became Bollywood actors. In 1975, he became a disciple of Osho and in the early 1980s, moved to Rajneeshpuram. Khanna and Gitanjali settled for a divorce in 1985.

In 1990, upon returning to India, Khanna married Kavita Daftary, daughter of industrialist Sharayu Daftary. They had a son and a daughter.

Illness and death
Khanna was hospitalised at Sir H.N. Reliance Foundation Hospital and Research Centre in Girgaon, Mumbai, on 2 April 2017 for a few weeks after suffering from severe dehydration. He died at 11:20 a.m. (IST) on 27 April, and it was revealed that he had been battling advanced bladder cancer.  He was cremated at the Worli Crematorium on the same day.

Filmography

Awards and nominations
 1975 – Filmfare Award for Best Supporting Actor for Haath Ki Safai
 1977 – Nominated – Filmfare Award for Best Supporting Actor for Hera Pheri
 1977 – Nominated – Filmfare Award for Best Actor for Shaque
 1979 – Nominated – Filmfare Award for Best Supporting Actor for Muqaddar Ka Sikander
 1981 – Nominated – Filmfare Award for Best Actor for Qurbani
1990 – Nominated – Filmfare Award for Best Supporting Actor for Chandni
 1999 – Filmfare Lifetime Achievement Award
 2005 – Stardust Awards – Role Model for the Year
 2007 – Zee Cine Award for Lifetime Achievement
 2017 – Dadasaheb Phalke Award (posthumously).

References

|-

External links

 
 

Indian male film actors
Film producers from Mumbai
Bharatiya Janata Party politicians from Punjab
1946 births
2017 deaths
Hindkowan people
Indian male television actors
Indian male voice actors
Male actors in Hindi cinema
People from Peshawar
Indian actor-politicians
Filmfare Lifetime Achievement Award winners
Rajneesh movement
India MPs 1998–1999
India MPs 1999–2004
India MPs 2004–2009
India MPs 2014–2019
Delhi Public School alumni
Punjabi people
Lok Sabha members from Punjab, India
20th-century Indian male actors
21st-century Indian male actors
Male actors from Mumbai
Deaths from cancer in India
Deaths from bladder cancer
Filmfare Awards winners
Politicians from Mumbai
People from Gurdaspur district
Dadasaheb Phalke Award recipients